Skate guards are plastic covers used in ice hockey and figure skating that are worn over ice skate blades when the skater is off the ice. Skate guards are used to keep the blades of skates sharp, and avoid any damage to blades when they are not being used. Material/fabric skate guards may be called 'Soakers', and have a slightly different purpose as they should not be used while the skater is walking around in the skates off the ice.

Not to be confused with "rink guards". A rink guard is a person who assists skaters and maintains order at public skating sessions.

Use in ice hockey
They are used in ice hockey to protect the players' skates from damage by surfaces other than ice. They are placed over top the skate blade to cover it. They protect the blades from cement, rocks, metal or wood which can damage the skate blade, resulting in uneven skating, due to rusty and dull blades. The skate guard is obviously not used when on the ice, as the skates will slip from the plastic onto the ice. They can be taken off easily and are the best way to maintain good blade condition for a long time in order to keep skate strides smooth and fast.

Types of skate guards
The most common type of skate guard is a plastic sheath that stays tight on the blades with metal springs. They can be trimmed to fit different sizes of blades. Manufacturers make them in many colors.

Another type of skate guard is the centipede guard, which has an elastic loop that fits around the top of the blade to keep the guard on.

Use in figure skating
Figure skating guards are usually made of plastic with a simple spring or other mechanical device to hold the guards tightly to the blades. They can be found in many colors and with internal lights that blink as the skater walks.  They are also called 'blade guards'. Figure skating guards historically were made of wood, but this has been supplanted in the last thirty years by plastic.

Safety
A common cause of accidents in skating rinks is to forget to remove the skate guard before stepping onto the ice. The skater's feet will slide out from under them, and result in an uncontrolled fall and, potentially, a blow to the head.

References

Ice hockey equipment
Bandy equipment